Maigret in Exile (French: La Maison du Juge) is a 1940 detective novel by the Belgian mystery writer Georges Simenon.

Synopsis
The mysterious moves of bureaucrats have exiled Maigret to a small town in the coast of Normandy where it rains all the time and there is nothing to do except for playing billiards in the local pub and sniff the gel that the local inspector lathers into his hair. Then an old woman shows up with a story about a body in the house of a judge in the fishing village of l'Aiguillon and things get interesting. A young woman with a mysterious ailment (something to do with being over-sexed but Simenon never explains what exactly is wrong with her), a young man with a temper, a hotel waitress with a secret, and an ex-judge with taste and style.

Publication history
The book was published in France in 1940, just before the Fall of France to the Nazis. The book was first translated into English in 1978 by Eileen Ellenbogen and published by Hamish Hamilton in the United Kingdom. The First American edition appeared in 1979.

Adaptations
An episode entitled "The Judge's House" for BBC's television program Maigret aired on 26 November 1963. Rupert Davies played Maigret.

A French television version with Jean Richard as Maigret aired on 1 February 1969.

A second French television version with Bruno Cremer aired on 15 March 1992.

References 

1942 Belgian novels
Maigret novels
Novels set in France